The  occurred between pro-Imperial and Tokugawa shogunate forces during the Boshin War in Japan. The battle started on 27 January 1868 (or fourth year of Keiō, first month, 3rd day, according to the lunar calendar), when the forces of the shogunate and the allied forces of Chōshū, Satsuma and Tosa Domains clashed near Fushimi, Kyoto. The battle lasted for four days, ending in a decisive defeat for the shogunate.

Background
On 4 January 1868, the restoration of imperial rule was formally proclaimed. Shōgun Tokugawa Yoshinobu had earlier resigned his authority to the emperor, agreeing to "be the instrument for carrying out" imperial orders. The Tokugawa shogunate had ended. However, while Yoshinobu's resignation created a nominal void at the highest level of government, his apparatus of state continued to exist. Moreover, the Tokugawa family remained a prominent force in the evolving political order, a prospect hard-liners from Satsuma and Chōshū found intolerable.

Although the majority of fifteen-year-old Emperor Meiji's consultative assembly was happy with the formal declaration of direct rule by the court and tended to support a continued collaboration with the Tokugawa, Saigō Takamori physically threatened members of the assembly into ordering the confiscation of Yoshinobu's lands.

Although he initially agreed to the court's demands, on 17 January 1868, Yoshinobu declared "that he would not be bound by the proclamation of the restoration and called on the court to rescind it." On 24 January, after considerable provocation by Satsuma's rōnin in Edo, Yoshinobu, from his base at Osaka Castle decided to prepare an attack on Kyōto, ostensibly to dislodge the Satsuma and Chōshū elements dominating the court and "freeing" young Emperor Meiji from their influence.

Prelude
The battle started when shogunate forces moved in the direction of Kyoto to deliver a letter from Yoshinobu, warning the Emperor of the intrigues plotted by Satsuma and the court nobles who supported it, such as Iwakura Tomomi.

The 15,000-strong shogunal army outnumbered the Satsuma–Chōshū army by 3 to 1, and consisted mostly of men from the Kuwana and Aizu Domains, reinforced by Shinsengumi irregulars. Although some of its members were mercenaries, others, such as the Denshūtai, had received training from French military advisers. Some of the men deployed in the front lines were armed in archaic fashion, with pikes and swords. For example, the troops of Aizu had a combination of modern soldiers and samurai, as did the troops of Satsuma to a lesser degree. The Bakufu had almost fully equipped troops and Chōshū troops were the most modern and organized of all. According to historian Conrad Totman: "In terms of army organization and weaponry, the four main protagonists probably rank in this order: Chōshū was best; Bakufu infantry was next; Satsuma was next; and Aizu and most liege vassal forces were last."

There was no clearly defined intent to fight on the part of the shogunate troops, attested by the many empty rifles of the men in the vanguard. Motivation and leadership on the part of the shogunate also seems to have been lacking.

Although the forces of Chōshū and Satsuma were outnumbered, they were fully modernized with Armstrong howitzers, Minié rifles and one Gatling gun. The shogunate forces had been slightly lagging in term of equipment, although a core elite force had been recently trained by the French military mission to Japan (1867–68). The Shogun also relied on troops supplied by allied domains, which were not necessarily as advanced in terms of military equipment and methods, making up an army that had both modern and outdated elements.

The Royal Navy, generally supportive of Satsuma and Chōshū, maintained a fleet lying at anchor in Osaka harbour, a factor of uncertainty which led to the shogunate maintaining the garrison at Osaka with a significant part of its army in reserve rather than commit them to the offensive in Kyōto. This foreign naval presence was related to the protection orders for the foreign settlements at Hyōgo (modern Kobe), and the very recent opening of the ports of Hyōgo and Ōsaka by decree to foreign trade three weeks earlier on 1 January 1868. Tokugawa Yoshinobu was in bed with a severe chill, and could not participate directly in the operations.

Events of 27 January
On 27 January 1868 Tokugawa Yoshinobu, based at Osaka Castle, south of Kyoto, started to move his troops north to Kyoto, through two main roads, one being the Toba road (鳥羽街道), and the other the Fushimi road (伏見街道). Altogether about 13,000 troops were moving forward, although they were widely spread out, leaving about 8,500 for the action at Toba–Fushimi. The overall commander (rikugun bugyō) of the operation was Takenaka Shigekata.

Toba encounter

The shogunate forces move in the direction of Toba under the command of Vice-Commander Ōkubo Tadayuki, making a total of 2,000 to 2,500 troops. At around 17:00, the shogunate vanguard, made up largely of about 400 men of the Mimawarigumi, armed with pikes and some firearms, under Sasaki Tadasaburo, approached a Satsuma-manned barrier post at the Koeda Bridge (小枝橋), Toba (located in what is now part of Minami-ku, Kyoto). They were followed by two infantry battalions (歩兵), rifles empty as they did not expect a fight, under Tokuyama Kōtarō, and further south by eight companies from Kuwana with four cannons. Some Matsuyama and Takamatsu troops and a few others were also participating, but Bakufu cavalry and artillery seem to have been absent. In front of them were about 900 entrenched troops from Satsuma, with four cannons.

After denying the shogunate force permission to pass peacefully, the Satsuma force opened fire from the flank, the first shots of the Boshin War. A Satsuma shell exploded on a gun carriage next to the horse of shogunal commander Takigawa Tomotaka, causing the horse to throw Takigawa and bolt. The startled horse ran wild, throwing the shogunate column into panic and disarray. The Satsuma attack was forceful and quickly sent the shogunate troops in disarray and retreat.

Sasaki ordered his men to charge the Satsuma gunners, but since the Mimawarigumi was armed only with spears and swords, his men were killed en masse. However, the Kuwana forces and a unit under Kubota Shigeaki held their ground, making the skirmish rage on inconclusively. The Shogunate troops set fire to various houses as they retreated, but that allowed Satsuma snipers to aim more easily. The situation stabilized during the night, as troops from Kuwana arrived in reinforcement.

The Toba battlefield has been transformed into a public park, Tobarikyūato-kōen (鳥羽離宮跡公園), which contains a monument to the battle. It is located just between the Koeda Bridge, where the Satsuma forces were stationed, and the Jōnangū Temple (城南宮), where the Imperial forces had their headquarters.

Fushimi encounter

On the same day, Satsuma–Chōshū forces further to the southeast at Fushimi also inconclusively engaged Shogunal forces in their area. The Satsuma–Chōshū forces started firing on the Shogunal forces when they heard the firing of cannons from the area of Toba. The Shogunal forces were composed of Bakufu troops, Shinsengumi and Aizu troops.

A violent encounter took place for the control of Bungo Bridge (豊後橋).

Events of 28 January

On 28 January, Iwakura Tomomi gave Saigō Takamori and Ōkubo Toshimichi orders obtained from Emperor Meiji proclaiming Tokugawa Yoshinobu and his followers to be enemies of the court, authorizing their suppression by military force, and granting use of the Imperial brocade banners. These brocade banners were prepared beforehand, having been made by Ōkubo Toshimichi a few months previously, and stored in Chōshū domain and in the Satsuma Kyoto residence until an appropriate opportunity presented itself.

In addition, Imperial Prince Yoshiaki, a young man of 22, who had lived as a Buddhist monk at the monzeki temple of Ninna-ji was named nominal commander in chief of the army. Although the Prince had no military experience, this nomination effectively transformed the Satsuma-Chōshū Alliance forces into an Imperial army (kangun), which proved to be a powerful tool of psychological warfare, sending shogunal forces into confusion and disarray, since anyone who fired on the army would automatically become a traitor to the emperor.

The Bakufu forces that had been to Toba retreated and regrouped with other Bakufu troops at Tominomori, where they set up their command base.

Meanwhile, the Battle of Awa took place that same day on the nearby Inland Sea. It was the first naval battle between modern fleets in Japan, and ended with a small shogunal victory over a Satsuma fleet, but was insignificant to the unfolding of the land battle.

Takasegawa encounter

The forces which had been to Fushimi, consisting in Aizu troops, Shinsengumi and Yūgekitai guerilla troops were again attacked at Takasegawa and Ujigawa on the morning of the 28th by the troops of Satsuma and Chōshū, and were forced to retreat in the direction of Yodo Castle after a bitter fight.

Events of 29 January

Tominomori encounter

The Shogunal forces which had regrouped at Tominomori were attacked by the forces of Satsuma in the morning. Around noon, the Imperial brocade banner appeared from behind the Satsuma–Chōshū lines. At first, neither side recognized the strange banner. Messengers had to be sent to both sides to explain what it was. Shogunal forces were thrown into confusion and Satsuma-Chōshū forces, their morale boosted, drew swords and charged the shogunal lines. The shogunal forces attempted to counter-attack, but were forced to retreat in disarray. In the afternoon, the Shogunal forces had once again to retreat to the area of Nōsho, in the direction of the Yodo Castle.

Shogunal forces attempted to regroup at Yodo Castle, but were refused admission, as the daimyō of Yodo Domain had decided to defect to the Imperial side on the appearance of the Imperial banner and defeat of the Shogunal forces. The daimyō of Yodo maintained his gates closed despite the supplication of the retreating army, thus denying them a major means of defense, forcing them to flee as far as Osaka castle. The daimyō of strategically located Tsu Domain followed two days later.

Events of 30 January

The retreating shogunal troops were progressively streaming into Osaka Castle.

At Osaka Castle, Tokugawa Yoshinobu gathered his advisors and military leaders to plan strategy and, to boost morale, advised that he would personally take to the field as commander of bakufu forces. That evening however, he slipped away from Osaka Castle accompanied by the daimyōs of Aizu and Kuwana to escape back to Edo on the shogunate warship Kaiyō Maru.

As Kaiyō Maru had not arrived, he took refuge for the night on an American warship, anchored in Osaka Bay. Kaiyō Maru arrived the following day.

When the remnants of his forces learned that the shōgun had abandoned them, they departed Osaka Castle, which was later surrendered to Imperial forces without resistance. Yoshinobu later claimed that he had been disturbed by the Imperial approval given to the actions of Satsuma and Chōshū, and, once the brocade banner had appeared, he had lost all will to fight.

French advisors Jules Brunet and Cazeneuve, who were present at the battle, left Osaka and returned to Edo on 12 January, together with Enomoto Takeaki on board the Fujiyama. Enomoto brought with him various documents and a treasure of 180,000 ryō. They arrived in Edo on 14 January.

Aftermath

The effects of the Battle of Toba–Fushimi were out of proportion to its small scale. The prestige and morale of the Tokugawa bakufu was seriously weakened, and many daimyōs who had remained neutral now declared in favor of the Emperor and offered military support to prove their new loyalties. Even more significantly, the ill-conceived attempt by Tokugawa Yoshinobu to regain control silenced elements within the new imperial government who favored a peaceful resolution to the conflict.

Osaka Castle, an important symbol of Tokugawa hegemony over western Japan, fell to Imperial forces. The victory set a course for a military settlement rather than a political compromise.

See also
 Firearms of Japan

Notes

References

References
 Fukushima Hiroshi. Bakumatsu Ishin: Yume no Ato Kikō. Tokyo: Kyōiku Shoseki, 1990.
 
 
 
 
 .
 Yamakawa Kenjirō. Hōshu Aizu Byakkōtai Jūkyūshi-den. Aizu-Wakamatsu: Aizu Chōrei Gikai, 1926.
 Yamakawa Kenjirō. Aizu Boshin Senshi. Tokyo: Tokyo Daigaku Shuppankai, 1933.

External links

 National Archives of Japan: Boshinshoyo Kinki oyobi Gunki Shinzu, precise reproduction of Imperial Standard and the colors used by Government Army at Battle of Toba–Fushimi

Battles involving Japan
1868 in Japan
Battles of the Boshin War
Conflicts in 1868
January 1868 events
History of Kyoto